Cottage Hill State Forest is located in Escambia County, Florida. In 2013 it was reported that the lands might be sold to raise money.

See also
List of Florida state forests

References

External links
 U.S. Geological Survey Map at the U.S. Geological Survey Map Website. Retrieved December 16, 2022.

Florida state forests
Protected areas of Escambia County, Florida